Expedition 16 was the 16th expedition to the International Space Station (ISS).
The first two crew members, Yuri Malenchenko and Peggy Whitson, launched on 10 October 2007, aboard Soyuz TMA-11, and were joined by spaceflight participant Sheikh Muszaphar Shukor, the first Malaysian in space.

Expedition 15 Flight Engineer Clayton Anderson did not land with the Soyuz TMA-10, so he was considered part of Expedition 16 for the few weeks prior to the arrival of STS-120. STS-120 launched on 23 October, docked on 25 October, and replaced Anderson with new Flight Engineer Daniel Tani. Following docking, the Soyuz seat liners for Anderson and Tani were swapped, and Anderson became part of the STS-120 crew.  Léopold Eyharts, who came aboard during STS-122, joined the mission on 9 February 2008, replacing Tani. The crew was then joined by Garrett Reisman, who was launched aboard Endeavour with STS-123, on 11 March 2008, replacing Eyharts. Reisman joined Expedition 16 in progress, and was a part of Expedition 17 as well. Upon reentry, the astronaut's Soyuz TMA-11 spacecraft suffered a minor malfunction, causing the craft to follow a very steep ballistic descent. As a result, the crew experienced forces up to 10 G, ending up about 260 miles (418 km) west of the targeted landing site. Roscosmos reported all three crew members were doing just fine and in good health.

Crew

Backup crew 
 Michael Fincke Commander - NASA (for Whitson)
 Salizhan Sharipov Flight Engineer 1 -  RSA (for Malenchenko)
 Greg Chamitoff Flight Engineer 2 -  NASA (for Anderson)
 Sandra Magnus Flight Engineer 2 -  NASA (for Tani)
 Frank De Winne Flight Engineer 2 -  ESA (for Eyharts)
 Timothy Kopra Flight Engineer 2 - NASA (for Reisman)

Mission details

Docked: 12 October 2007 14:50 UTC
Undocked: 19 April 2008 6:06 UTC
Time docked: 192 days

Expedition 16 was the first ISS mission to include two crew members who had served on a previous expedition, and the first time a former commander (Malenchenko) returned as a flight engineer. Whitson was the first female commander of an ISS expedition, and with STS-120 commanded by female astronaut Pamela Melroy, it marked the first time that two female mission commanders were in orbit simultaneously. On her first expedition, Whitson implemented a "Friday night movie night" to help the crew wind down at the end of the week, and plans to keep the custom of adding some levity to the station going for Expedition 16. Anderson incorporated some entertainment into the daily planning conference with the ground, quizzing the ground team on a wide variety of subjects, and Michael Lopez-Alegria did a similar activity with movie and music trivia.

STS-120
The first major objective of the increment was accomplished successfully on 26 October, when the crew of STS-120 delivered the Harmony module, and attached it to a temporary location on the Unity module. The joint crews also moved the P6 truss, and relocated it from its position on top of the station, to its final port-side position, during the third of four spacewalks.

Configuration of Harmony

Following the departure of STS-120, a series of Extra-vehicular activity (EVA) and robotic activities were carried out to move the Pressurized Mating Adapter (PMA-2) from the end of the Destiny laboratory, to the end of Harmony. Whitson and Malenchenko carried out the increment's first EVA on 9 November, that prepared the docking port for relocation. On 12 November, Whitson and Tani used the station's Mobile Servicing System (robotic arm) to detach the docking port, and relocated it to the forward port of Harmony. On 14 November, the Tani and Whitson again used the robotic arm and moved Harmony from its temporary location, to its permanent location on the forward port of Destiny.

On 20 November, Whitson and Tani completed the second EVA for the increment, a 7-hour, 16-minute spacewalk to outfit the Harmony node in its new position. All tasks were accomplished, and three get-ahead tasks were performed.
On 24 November, Whitson and Tani completed the third EVA for the increment, a 7-hour, 4-minute spacewalk to complete the outfitting of Harmony. All task were accomplished, and photographic inspection of the starboard Solar Alpha Rotary Joint (SARJ) was performed, as well as some ISS maintenance get-ahead tasks.

EVA milestone
On 18 December 2007, during the fourth spacewalk of Expedition 16 to inspect the S4 starboard Solar Alpha Rotary Joint (SARJ), the ground team in Mission Control informed Whitson that she had become the female astronaut with the most cumulative EVA time in NASA history, as well as the most EVAs, with her fifth EVA. Three hours and 37 minutes into the spacewalk, Whitson surpassed NASA astronaut Sunita Williams with a total time at that point of 29 hours and 18 minutes. At the completion of Whitson's fifth EVA, the 100th in support of ISS assembly and maintenance, Whitson's cumulative EVA time became 32 hours, and 36 minutes, which placed her in 20th place for total EVA time.

STS-122
STS-122 delivered Columbus and replaced Dan Tani with Léopold Eyharts.

STS-123
STS-123 delivered the first element of Kibō and replaced Léopold Eyharts with Garrett Reisman.

ATV Jules-Verne
Expedition 16 also saw the arrival of the first Automated Transfer Vehicle (ATV) to the station, named Jules Verne after the science fiction author.

Soyuz TMA-12
Expedition 16 also saw the arrival of the first Korean astronaut, Yi So-yeon.

Extra-vehicular activity

References

External links

 NASA: Expedition 16
 Roscosmos:Soyuz TMA-11 launch page in English ,
 NASA: STS-120
 NASA: STS-122
 NASA: STS-123
 Expedition 16 Photography

Expedition 16
2007 in spaceflight
2008 in spaceflight